Inwangsa is a Buddhist temple of the Bonwon Order in Mt. Inwangsan, Seoul, South Korea. It is located at San 2 Muak-dong, in the Jongno-gu area of the city. When King Taejo of Joseon Dynasty established the capital city in Seoul, he assigned Josaeng (조생 祖生), a monk from a Buddhist temple affiliated to the royal court as the head monk of the new temple to establish it at the site.

See also
List of Buddhist temples in Seoul
Korean Buddhism

References

External links

Religious organizations established in the 14th century
Buddhist temples in Seoul
Jongno District